Carl Bissuti (16 February 1899 in , Lower Austria – 14 September 1974) was an Austrian operatic bass

Life and career 
Born in Stephanshart, Bissuti originally aspired to the career of a railway official. At a concert his voice caught the attention and the famous Salzburg Festival singer Richard Mayr campaigned for him to be accepted as a student at the Mozarteum. His singing teacher was Bianca Bianchi. In the 1922–23 season, he was engaged as choirist at the Salzburger Landestheater. This was followed by engagements as an actor, first for three seasons in Salzburg, then for two seasons in Linz. In 1928, he was engaged as a singer in Trier. This was followed by engagements in Troppau. (1932–33), Bielefeld (1933–34) and Darmstadt (1934–35).

In 1934, he was invited by Clemens Krauss for a guest performance at the Vienna State Opera - as Sarastro in The Magic Flute. Thereupon he was engaged at the Haus am Ring from 1935, where he sang almost everything that belonged to his subject, from Mozart to Kienzl, from Verdi to Wagner. The Austrian Theatre Museum features role models from Jaromír Weinberger's Wallenstein' and Lehár's The Land of Smiles'. From 1936 to 1939, he was engaged every summer at the Salzburg Festival. He there sang first under the musical direction of Arturo Toscanini (Magic Flute, Fidelio, Meistersinger of Nuremberg), by Bruno Walter (Così fan tutte) and by Felix von Weingartner (The Corregidor). After the annexation of Austria to Nazi Germany, he was given the title of "The Corregidor" by the conductors Wilhelm Furtwängler, (Meistersinger) and Hans Knappertsbusch (Fidelio, Freischütz and Tannhäuser) to Salzburg.

The singer remained a member of the Vienna State Opera ensemble until 1942, when he received a permanent engagement at the Salzburger Landestheater. In 1944, he was seriously injured during an air raid on Vienna. He had to give up his profession and later moved to Graz.

He was married with the soprano Josefine Stelzer (1902-1958). The couple had at least one son, Kristian Bissuti, born 1940, who became a photographer.

Bissuti died in Graz age 75.

Roles

Premiere 
 1937: Marco Frank: Die fremde Frau – Wiener Staatsoper (Dr. Chesnel)
 1937: Jaromír Weinberger: Wallenstein – Wiener Staatsoper (Wachtmeister)
 1938: Franz Salmhofer: Iwan Tarassenko – Wiener Staatsoper (Exzellenz Burulbasch)

Repertoire

Recordings 
There are relatively few sound documents from Bissuti. In Salzburg, performances of The Magic Flute and  die Meistersinger von Nürnberg remain. Koch has published archive recordings from the Vienna State Opera, for example Aida (Ramfis) and Der Freischütz (Kuno).

See also
 
 Salzburg Festival: history and repertoire, 1935–1937
 Opera casts of the Salzburg Festival 1938 to 1944

Sources 
 Karl-Josef Kutsch, Leo Riemens: Großes Sängerlexikon, Walter de Gruyter 2012, Volume 4,

References

External links 

 
 

Operatic basses
20th-century Austrian male opera singers
1899 births
1974 deaths
People from Lower Austria